Lawrence Bernard Brennan Casey (September 6, 1905 – June 15, 1977) was an American prelate of the Roman Catholic Church.  He served as the fifth bishop of the Diocese of Paterson in New Jersey (1966–1977). He previously served as an auxiliary bishop of the Diocese of Rochester in New York (1954-1966).

Biography

Early life 
Lawrence Casey was born in Rochester, New York, to Joseph Leo and Agnes Madeline (née Switzer) Casey. He studied at St. Andrew's Preparatory Seminary from 1919 until 1924, when he entered St. Bernard's Seminary. 

Casey was ordained to the priesthood on June 7, 1930. After his ordination, he  served as a curate at St. Mary's Parish in Rochester.  He then served as secretary to Bishops John O'Hern (1932-1933), Edward Mooney (1933-1937), and James E. Kearney (1937-1946). Casey was named rector of Holy Cross Parish in 1946 and of Sacred Heart Cathedral, both in Rochester, in 1952.

Auxiliary Bishop of Rochester 
On February 10, 1953, Casey was appointed auxiliary bishop of the Diocese of Rochester and Titular Bishop of Cea by Pope Pius XII. He received his episcopal consecration on May 5, 1953, from Cardinal Francis Spellman, with Bishops Walter Foery and Alexander M. Zaleski serving as co-consecrators.

Bishop of Paterson 
Following the death of Bishop James Navagh, Casey was named bishop of the Diocese of Paterson on March 4, 1966. Pope Paul VI accepted Casey's resignation as bishop of Paterson on June 13, 1977. Lawrence Casey died in Paterson just two days later on June 15, 1977, at age 71.

References

1905 births
1977 deaths
Religious leaders from Rochester, New York
Participants in the Second Vatican Council
20th-century Roman Catholic bishops in the United States
Roman Catholic bishops of Paterson